The Lucknow Brigade was an infantry brigade of the British Indian Army formed in 1907 as a result of the Kitchener Reforms.  It was mobilized as 22nd (Lucknow) Brigade at the outbreak of the First World War as part of Indian Expeditionary Force E.  It served in Egypt in 1915 before being broken up in January 1916.

The brigade was reformed in India in 1917 for internal security duties and to aid the expansion of the Indian Army in the last year of the war.  It remained part of the British Indian Army between the wars under several designations and was the 6th (Lucknow) Infantry Brigade in September 1939.

History
The Kitchener Reforms, carried out during Lord Kitchener's tenure as Commander-in-Chief, India (1902–09), completed the unification of the three former Presidency armies, the Punjab Frontier Force, the Hyderabad Contingent and other local forces into one Indian Army.  Kitchener identified the Indian Army's main task as the defence of the North-West Frontier against foreign aggression (particularly Russian expansion into Afghanistan) with internal security relegated to a secondary role.  The Army was organized into divisions and brigades that would act as field formations but also included internal security troops.

The Lucknow Brigade was formed in June 1907 as a result of the Kitchener Reforms.  The brigade formed part of the 8th (Lucknow) Division.

22nd (Lucknow) Brigade
In October 1914, the brigade was mobilized as the 22nd (Lucknow) Brigade and was sent to Egypt as the core of Indian Expeditionary Force E.  The brigade joined the 11th Indian Division when it was formed in Egypt on 24 December and served on the Suez Canal Defences.  After the defeat of the Turkish attempts to cross the canal on 3–4 February 1915, the division acted as a relieving depot for the divisions in France.  It was broken up on 31 May 1915 and the brigade came under direct command of the Suez Canal Defences.  The brigade was broken up in January 1916.

Reformed brigade
The Lucknow Brigade was reformed in 8th (Lucknow) Division in July 1917.  It remained with the division for the rest of the war, carrying out internal security duties.  In the final year of the war, the division (and brigade) took part in the general expansion of the Indian Army as new units were formed.

Post-war
The brigade remained part of the British Indian Army after the end of the war.  It underwent a number of changes of designation between the World Wars: 73rd Indian Infantry Brigade from May until September 1920, 19th Indian Infantry Brigade from November 1920 and 6th (Lucknow) Infantry Brigade from sometime in the 1920s.  For its subsequent history, see 6th (Lucknow) Infantry Brigade.

Orders of battle

Commanders
The brigade had the following commanders during its existence:

See also

 6th (Lucknow) Infantry Brigade in the Second World War
 8th (Lucknow) Cavalry Brigade in the First World War
 Force in Egypt

Notes

References

Bibliography

External links
 
 
 

Brigades of India in World War I
Military units and formations established in 1907
Military units and formations disestablished in 1916
Military units and formations established in 1917